Bilozirka may refer to several places in Ukraine:

 Bilozirka, Mykolaiv Oblast, a village in Vitovka Raion
 Bilozirka, Ternopil Oblast, a village in Lanivtsi Raion
 Bilozirka, Vinnytsia Oblast, a village in Lityn Raion

See also 
 Bilozerka, an urban-type settlement in Kherson Oblast, Ukraine
 Bilozerka (river), Ukraine
 Bilozerka Raion